Palash Sen, M.B.B.S. is an Indian singer, songwriter, musician, composer, physician, and actor best known as the founder and frontman of India's Rock/Pop band Euphoria.

Early life and education
Born to doctors, he comes from a Baidya Brahmin family of Rajvaidyas (Sen Sharma) and is the 17th generation physician of his family. He was born in Lucknow, brought up in Delhi, and used to stay in Connaught Place's Railway Colony and Srinagar.

He did his schooling from St. Columba's School, Delhi. He was active in theatre and singing right from his school days and that's where he realised his singing capabilities.

Thereafter he studied medicine at the University College of Medical Sciences (UCMS) and Guru Teg Bahadur Hospital, New Delhi, and received his M.B.B.S. degree.

Career
While in college, Palash founded his band Euphoria. He had started composing songs from in college days and was writing them in English. His first composition is believed to be 'Heaven on the Seventh Floor' which was an ode to his college hostel room, on the seventh floor.

After finishing college, Palash met DJ Bhaduri, and their friendship took off instantly.

The duo have been working together ever since, and Palash regards DJ as the backbone of Euphoria. Euphoria's first release, 'Dhoom Pichuck Dhoom,' was a major commercial hit and received rave reviews from the critics worldwide.

A very famous single song is 'Maerii' which is sung in Hindi folk language. Euphoria went on to become the biggest Indian band, with five successful studio albums, one compilation and 17 music videos.

Palash's Bollywood debut came with Filhaal... (2001) directed by Meghna Gulzar, daughter of Indian poet and filmmaker Gulzar which also starred Tabu and Sushmita Sen. Thereafter he appeared in "And It Rained" segment of anthology film, Mumbai Cutting. Palash has also composed an eight-and-a-half-minute song for the film, and Euphoria performed on it.

Palash has done multiple television appearances, most notably FameX (2006), Channel V Popstars, MTV Rock On (with Euphoria, 2008), MTV Unplugged (with Euphoria, 2011), NDTV Greenathon (with Euphoria, 2012).

Solo projects, playback and collaborations
Over the years, Palash has collaborated with musicians and composers on songs, most notably
 Zindagi, Friday the 13th featuring Palash Sen
 Mauka, Indraneel Hariharan featuring Palash Sen
 Candywalk, Orange Street featuring Palash Sen
 Salma, Dhoondhte Reh Jaaoge (composers: Sajid Wajid)
 Kadavule Kadavule (Tamil) (2010 composer: Eeman)
 Main Kaun Hoon, Lamha (2010 composer: Mithoon Sharma)
 Music band Na Karo, Hum Tum aur Shabana (2011 composers: Sachin | Jigar)

Controversies
His remarks at a concert in Mood Indigo 2013, IIT Bombay was deemed to be sexist by the organizers and public.
In 2012, Palash accused the music composer Ram Sampath for plagiarising the main chorus of the title track of popular television series Satyamev Jayate produced and hosted by Aamir Khan from a Euphoria song by the same name, release on the 2000 album "Phir Dhoom". He had reportedly sent a legal notice to the composer.

Personal life
He is married to Shalini Sen, a lecturer at Sri Venkateswara College, Delhi, and the couple have two children, Kinshuk Sen and Kyna Sen.

Kinshuk attended UCLA, after finishing his schooling from The Mother's International School, New Delhi. Kyna was also a student of The Mother's International School, New Delhi.

Sen runs a clinic in his house in Delhi, along with a studio, also known as "The Clinic".

Albums
 1998 – Dhoom
 2000 – Phir Dhoom
 2003 – Gully
 2006 – Mehfuz
 2008 – ReDhoom
 2010 – Follow Your Dreams
 2011 – Item
 2012 – Sharnaagat
2016 - halla bol (single)
2018 - Alvida (single)
2019 - Mujhse Kaha Naa Gaya (single)
2021 - Sale

Filmography
 Filhaal... (2002)
 Mumbai Cutting (2010)
 Sondhe Namar Aage (Bengali)
 Aisa Yeh Jahaan (2015)
 Jiya Jaye (Director)(2017)
 Iktarfa (Director)(2018)

Playback singing

References

External links
 

20th-century Indian singers
Living people
1965 births
Indian rock singers
Bollywood playback singers
Singers from Delhi
Delhi University alumni
Indian male singer-songwriters
Indian singer-songwriters
Bengali playback singers
Bengali singers
St. Columba's School, Delhi alumni
Indian male playback singers
21st-century Indian singers
20th-century Indian male singers
21st-century Indian male singers